Wilbur "Shorty" Luft (June 1, 1908 – December 20, 1991) was an American football player and coach. He served as the head football coach at Central Washington University from 1948 to 1949, compiling  a record of 8–9–1. Luft was a quarterback at Washington State University in the early 1930s and was named the starter for the 1931 Rose Bowl.

Head coaching record

College

References

1908 births
1991 deaths
American football quarterbacks
Central Washington Wildcats football coaches
Washington State Cougars football players
High school football coaches in Washington (state)